Mortonia is a small genus of flowering shrubs known as saddlebushes, sand paper bush or mortonias. These are rough, thorny, hairy shrubs with leathery leaves and panicles of fleshy white to purplish flowers. They bear nutlets containing 1 seed each. They are native to the southwestern United States and northern Mexico, where they are most abundant in dry regions.

Selected species:
Mortonia greggii
Mortonia scabrella
Mortonia sempervirens
Mortonia utahensis

References

External links 
 Jepson Manual Treatment

Celastraceae
Celastrales genera